Rajeev Tarara is an Indian politician and a member of 17th Legislative Assembly of Uttar Pradesh of India. He represents the Dhanaura (Assembly constituency) in Amroha district of Uttar Pradesh and is a member of the Bharatiya Janata Party.

Early life and education
Tarara was born 2 January 1981 in the Tarara village in Amroha district of Uttar Pradesh to father Totaram. He is unmarried till now. He belongs to Scheduled Caste (Jatav) community. He had three-degrees, M.A., BEd, L.L.B. He is an agriculturist by profession. Since 2007, he also had a Manager post in Krishna Public School Amroha.

Political career
Tarara started his journey in politics with 17th Legislative Assembly of Uttar Pradesh (2017) elections, he got ticket by Bharatiya Janata Party from Dhanaura (Assembly constituency). He was successful in the legislature in the first attempt and elected MLA by defeating Samajwadi Party candidate Jagram Singh by a margin of 38,229 votes.

Posts held

References

Uttar Pradesh MLAs 2017–2022
Bharatiya Janata Party politicians from Uttar Pradesh
Living people
1981 births
Uttar Pradesh MLAs 2022–2027